The 2005 Nevada Wolf Pack football team represented the University of Nevada, Reno during the 2005 NCAA Division I-A football season. Nevada competed as a member of the Western Athletic Conference (WAC). The Wolf Pack were led by Chris Ault in his 21st overall and 2nd straight season since taking over as head coach for the third time in 2004. They played their home games at Mackay Stadium.

Schedule

Game summaries

Washington State

UNLV

at Colorado State

at San Jose State

Idaho

Louisiana Tech

at Boise State

Hawaii

at New Mexico State

at Utah State

Fresno State

vs. UCF

References

Nevada
Nevada Wolf Pack football seasons
Western Athletic Conference football champion seasons
Hawaii Bowl champion seasons
Nevada Wolf Pack football